Coleophora rustica is a moth of the family Coleophoridae. It is found in central Australia.

References

Moths of Australia
rustica
Moths described in 1996